The 2023 STCC TCR Scandinavia Touring Car Championship season will be the fourteenth season of the championship and the seventh season following the adoption of the TCR specification. The season is scheduled to start on July 8th at Falkenbergs Motorbana and conclude on September 23rd at Mantorp Park. The reigning drivers' champion from the 2022 season was Robert Dahlgren, who drove a CUPRA Leon Competición TCR. His team, CUPRA Dealer Team - PWR Racing, also won the team title. Axel Bengtsson, also driving a CUPRA Leon Competición TCR, was the junior drivers' champion, while Marius Solberg Hansen, in a Volkswagen Golf GTI TCR, won the Däckteam trophy.

By becoming the world's first electric national championship, 2023 STCC TCR Scandinavia Touring Car Championship will mark a significant milestone in the motorsports industry's transition towards sustainability and pave the way for more electric racing series to emerge in the future.

Teams and drivers

Race calendar and results

Championship standings 

This year's scoring system, with points now being handed to the top 15 finishers.

References

External links 
 

STCC TCR Scandinavia Touring Car Championshopb
STCC TCR Scandinavia Touring Car Championship
STCC